Oncidium pubes is a species of orchid found from Colombia, southeastern and southern Brazil to northeastern Argentina.

References

External links 

pubes
Orchids of Argentina
Orchids of Brazil
Orchids of Colombia